Sweet Enemy is a 2017 South Korean television series starring Park Eun-hye, Yoo Gun, Lee Jae-woo, and Park Tae-in. The series airs daily on SBS from 8:30 a.m. to 9:10 a.m. (KST).

Plot
Oh Dal-Nim (Park Eun-Hye) is falsely accused of murder. She decides to take revenge on those responsible for misery.

Cast

Main
 Park Eun-hye as Oh Dal-nim
Staff of Best Food Product Development Department. She is an expert on food. Her life was totally changed after she was wrongly accused of murdering Jae-hee.

 Yoo Gun as Choi Sun-ho
General Manager of Best Food, Bok-nam's grandson. Although he will be the inheritor of the company soon, he still fascinated in comic books. After his lover Jae-hee's death, he became deeply depressed and lost his motivation in life.

 Lee Jae-woo as Jung Jae-wook
Famous chef in Korea, Yi-ran's step son. He is usually surrounded by female admirers.
  
 Park Tae-in as Hong Se-na
Jae-hee's best friend since their childhood, Department Manager of Best Food Product Development Department. She acts like a kind-hearted person in front of everyone, but she hates Jae-hee because of her success. One day, she pushed Jae-hee down from the upper verandah of Sun-ho's family summer villa and she died.

Supporting

People around Jae-wook 
 Lee Bo-hee as Yoon Yi-ran
 Choi Ja-hye as Jung Jae-hee

People around Se-na 
 Kim Hee-jung as Ma Yoo-Kyung
 Kim Ho-chang as Hong Se-kang

People around Sun-ho / Best Food 
 Jang Jung-hee as Cha Bok-nam
 Lee Jin-ah as Ko Eun-jung
 Choi Ryung as Choi Go-bong
 Ok Go-woon as Choi Roo-bi

People around Dal-nim 
 Kwon Jae-hee as Kang Soon-hee
 Lee Chung-mi as Hwang Geum-sook

Ratings 
In this table,  represent the lowest ratings and  represent the highest ratings.

Notes

References

External links
  

Seoul Broadcasting System television dramas
2017 South Korean television series debuts
Korean-language television shows
South Korean romance television series
South Korean melodrama television series
2017 South Korean television series endings
Television series by SM Life Design Group